Bostryx is a genus of air-breathing land snails, terrestrial pulmonate gastropod mollusks in the family Bulimulidae.

Taxonomy 
Previously this genus was placed within the Orthalicidae.

Bostryx sensu stricto is the type genus of the subfamily Bostrycinae, but some species of Bostryx sensu lato are placed within Bulimulinae. There is need further research to elucidate which subgenera belong to which subfamily.

Distribution 
There are 29 species from the genus Bostryx in Chile and numerous species in other countries.

Ecology 
They live under stones and on cacti.

Bostryx feeds on lichens.

Species 
Species in the genus Bostryx include:

Bostryx sensu stricto
 Bostryx agueroi Weyrauch, 1960
 Bostryx edmundi Breure & Neubert, 2008
 Bostryx longispira Weyrauch, 1960
 Bostryx peruvianus (Pilsbry, 1944)
 Bostryx solutus (Troschel, 1847) - type species of the genus Bostryx
 Bostryx superbus Weyrauch, 1967
 Bostryx torallyi (d'Orbigny, 1835)

Bostryx sensu lato
 Bostryx apodemetes (d'Orbigny, 1835)
 Bostryx bilineatus (G. B. Sowerby I, 1833)
 Bostryx strobeli Parodiz, 1956

other Bostryx species:
 Bostryx affinis (Broderip, 1832)
 Bostryx aguilari Weyrauch, 1967 - 
 Bostryx alausiensis (Cousin, 1887)
 Bostryx albicans (Broderip, 1832) (synonym: Bulinus albicans Broderio, 1832)
 Bostryx anachoreta (Pfeiffer, 1856)
 Bostryx anomphalus Pilsbry, 1944
 Bostryx anachoreta (Pfeiffer, 1856)
 Bostryx baeri (Dautzenberg, 1901)
 Bostryx bonneti (Ancey, 1902)
 Bostryx ceroplasta (Pilsbry, 1896)
 Bostryx conspersus (Sowerby, 1833) - 
 Bostryx chusgonensis
 Bostryx chusgonensis sipas Breure & Mogollón Avila, 2010
 Bostryx delicatulus (Philippi, 1867)
 Bostryx derelictus (Broderip, 1832)
 Bostryx devillei Deville & Hupé, 1850;
 Bostryx elatus (Philippi, 1869)
 Bostryx eremothauma (Pilsbry, 1896)
 Bostryx erosus (Broderip, 1832)
 Bostryx erythrostoma (Sowerby, 1833)
 Bostryx fayssianus (Petit de la Saussaye, 1853) 
 Bostryx fragilis Breure & Mogollón Avila, 2010
 Bostryx gayi (Rehder, 1945)
 Bostryx granulatus Breure & Neubert, 2008
 Bostryx guttatus (Broderip, 1832)
 Bostryx haasi Weyrauch, 1960
 Bostryx hennahi (Gray, 1830)
 Bostryx holostoma (Pfeiffer, 1856)
 Bostryx huascensis (Reeve, 1848)
 Bostryx huayaboensis (Dautzenberg, 1901)
 Bostryx ignobilis (Philippi, 1867)
 Bostryx imeldae Weyrauch, 1958
 Bostryx inaquosum Breure, 1978
 Bostryx infundibulum (L. Pfeiffer, 1853)
 Bostryx iocosensis (Dautzenberg, 1901)
 Bostryx ireneae Araya, 2015
 Bostryx ischnus (Pilsbry, 1902)
 Bostryx juana (Cousin, 1887)
 Bostryx lactifluus (Pfeiffer, 1856)
 Bostryx leucostictus (Philippi, 1856)
 Bostryx lichenorum (Orbigny, 1835)
 Bostryx limensis (Reeve, 1849)
 Bostryx limonoicus (d'Orbigny, 1835)
 Bostryx lizarasoae Weyrauch, 1967
 Bostryx longispira Weyrauch, 1960
 Bostryx louisae Breure, 1978
 Bostryx luridus (L. Pfeiffer, 1863)
 Bostryx martinezi (Hylton Scott, 1965)
 Bostryx megomphalus Pilsbry, 1944
 Bostryx mejillonensis (Pfeiffer, 1857)
 Bostryx metamorphus (Pilsbry, 1896)
 Bostryx modestus (Broderip, 1832) - 
 Bostryx philippii (Rehder, 1945)
 Bostryx pruinosus (Sowerby, 1833)
 Bostryx pumilio (Rehder, 1945)
 Bostryx pupiformis (Broderip, 1833)
 Bostryx pustulosus (Broderip, 1832)
 Bostryx pygmaeus Weyrauch, 1960
 Bostryx pyrgidium (Haas, 1955)
 Bostryx raimondianus (Pilsbry, 1896)
 Bostryx reedi (Parodiz, 1947)
 Bostryx reentsi (Philippi, 1851)
 Bostryx rehderi Weyrauch, 1960
 Bostryx rhodacme (Pfeiffer, 1843)
 Bostryx rhodolarynx (Reeve, 1849)
 Bostryx rodriguezae Weyrauch, 1967
  Bostryx roselleus Miranda & Cuezzo, 2014
 Bostryx rouaulti (Hupé, 1854)
 Bostryx rudisculptus (Parodiz, 1956)
 Bostryx rusticellus (Morelet, 1860)
 Bostryx sagasteguii (Haas, 1966)
 Bostryx sandwichensis (L. Pfeiffer, 1846)
 Bostryx scabiosus (Sowerby, 1833)
 Bostryx scalariformis Broderip, 1832 - 
 Bostryx scotophilus Weyrauch, 1967
 Bostryx scutulatus (Broderip, 1832)
 Bostryx serotinus (Morelet, 1860)
 Bostryx simpliculus (L. Pfeiffer, 1855)
 Bostryx solutus (Troschel, 1847)
 Bostryx sordidus Lesson, 1826 - 
 Bostryx spiculatus (Morelet, 1860)
 Bostryx stelzneri (Dohrn, 1875)
 Bostryx strobeli (Parodiz, 1956)
 Bostryx styliger (Beck, 1837)
 Bostryx subcactorum (Pilsbry, 1896)
 Bostryx subelatus (Haas, 1948)
 Bostryx superbus Weyrauch, 1967
 Bostryx torallyi (d'Orbigny, 1835)
 Bostryx tortoranus (Doering, 1879)
 Bostryx tricinctus (Reeve, 1848)
 Bostryx tschudii (L. Pfeiffer, 1848)
 Bostryx tubulatus (Morelet, 1860)
 Bostryx tumidulus (L. Pfeiffer, 1842)
 Bostryx turritus (Broderip, 1832)
 Bostryx tyleri (Dall, 1912)
 Bostryx umbilicaris (Souleyet, 1842)
 Bostryx umbilicatellus (Pilsbry, 1896)
 Bostryx valdovinosi Araya, 2015
 Bostryx variabilis Herm, 1970
 Bostryx veruculum (Morelet, 1860)
 Bostryx viarius (Pilsbry, 1932)
 Bostryx vilchezi Weyrauch, 1960
 Bostryx virgula (Haas, 1951)
 Bostryx virgultorum (Morelet, 1863)
 Bostryx voithianus (Pfeiffer, 1847)
 Bostryx webbi (Haas, 1951)
 Bostryx weyrauchi Pilsbry, 1944
 Bostryx williamsi (L. Pfeiffer, 1858)
 Bostryx willinki Weyrauch, 1964
 Bostryx woodwardi (L. Pfeiffer, 1857)
 Bostryx zilchi Weyrauch, 1958

Synonyms
 Ataxellus Dall, 1912
 Ataxus Albers, 1850
 Bilamelliferus Weyrauch, 1958 (junior synonymy)
 Bostryx (Bostryx) Troschel, 1847· accepted, alternate representation
 Bostryx (Dentaxis) Pilsbry, 1902· accepted, alternate representation
 Bostryx (Discobostryx) Pilsbry & Olsson, 1949 (junior synonymy)
 Bostryx (Elatibostryx) Weyrauch, 1958 (junior synonymy)
 Bostryx (Geoceras) Pilsbry, 1896 (junior synonymy)
 Bostryx (Geopyrgus) Pilsbry, 1896· accepted, alternate representation
 Bostryx (Kionoptyx) <small>F. Haas, 1966· accepted, alternate representation
 Bostryx (Lissoacme) Pilsbry, 1896· accepted, alternate representation
 Bostryx (Multifasciatus) Weyrauch, 1958 (junior synonymy)
 Bostryx (Pampasinus) Weyrauch, 1958 (junior synonymy)
 Bostryx (Peronaeus) Albers, 1860
 Bostryx (Phenacotaxus) Dall, 1912
 Bostryx (Platybostryx) Pilsbry, 1896
 Bostryx (Pseudoperonaeus) Weyrauch, 1958 (junior synonymy)
 Bostryx (Scansicohlea) Pilsbry, 1930· accepted, alternate representation
 Bostryx (Vermetellus) F. Haas, 1951 (junior synonymy)
 Bulimulus (Ataxus) Albers, 1850 (junior synonymy)
 Bulimulus (Bostryx) Troschel, 1847 (original rank)
 Bulimulus (Lissoacme) Pilsbry, 1896
 Bulimulus (Peronaeus) Albers, 1850
 Bulimulus (Scansicochlea) F. Haas, 1932
 Elatibostryx Weyrauch, 1958
 Floreziellus Weyrauch, 1967 (junior synonymy)
 Geoceras Pilsbry, 1896
 Kionoptyx Haas, 1966 (junior synonymy)
 Multifasciatus Weyrauch, 1958
 Naesiotellus Weyrauch, 1967
 Naesiotus (Naesiotellus) Weyrauch, 1967 (junior synonymy)
 Pampasinus Weyrauch, 1958
 Peronaeus Albers, 1850
 Peronaeus (Lissoacme) Pilsbry, 1896
 Peronaeus (Peronaeus) Albers, 1850
 Phenacotaxus Dall, 1912
 Pseudoperonaeus Weyrauch, 1958
 Pyrgus Albers, 1850

References

External links
 

Bulimulidae
Gastropod genera